The Har Hevron Regional Council (Mo'atza Azorit Har Hevron) is an Israeli regional council in the southern Judean Hills area of Mount Hebron, in the southern West Bank, administering Israeli settlements. The headquarters are located adjacent to Otniel. The council was established in 1983. The chairman of the council is Yochay Damri.

While Kiryat Arba is physically located within the territory of the Har Hevron Regional Council, it is an independent town.

The council provides various municipal services to Adora, Avigayil, Beit Hagai, Beit Yatir, Carmel, Eshkolot, Livne, Ma'ale Hever, Ma'on, Mitzpe Asa'el, Negohot, Otniel, Sansana, Shim'a, Susya, Telem and Teneh Omarim.

Three of the settlements - Eshkolot, Sansana, and Beit Yatir - are in the so-called Seam Zone, on the Israeli side of the Israeli West Bank barrier, but still inside the West Bank.

References

External links
Official website  

 
Israeli regional councils in the West Bank
Government agencies established in 1983
1983 establishments in the Palestinian territories